Charles Knight may refer to:

Charles Knight (engraver) (1743–c. 1827), English engraver
Charles Knight (publisher) (1791–1873), English author and publisher
Charles Knight (doctor) (1808–1891), New Zealand doctor, public servant and botanist
Charles Parsons Knight (1829–1897), English painter
Charles Knight (civil servant) (1863–1941), British civil servant
Charles Landon Knight (1867–1933), American lawyer, publisher and United States Representative from Ohio
Charles Yale Knight (1868–1940), American engineer, inventor of the Knight engine
Charles R. Knight (1874–1953), American artist who specialized in dinosaur paintings
Charles Joseph Knight (born 1931), Canadian Surgeon General
Charles F. Knight (1936–2017), American businessman, former chairman of Emerson Electric
Charles Ray Knight (born 1952), American former Major League Baseball player
Charles T. Knight (fl. 1964–1994), American sound engineer
Charles Knight (cardiologist), cardiologist and chief executive of St Bartholomew's Hospital
Charles Knight (filmmaker) (born 1967), New Zealand filmmaker, actor and stuntman